Hoi Lai Estate is a public housing estate in Cheung Sha Wan, Kowloon, Hong Kong, built on the reclaimed land of south Cheung Sha Wan, near Lai Chi Kok station and four private housing estates, namely Aqua Marine, Banyan Garden, Liberté and The Pacifica. The estate consists of 12 residential buildings and a shopping centre completed between 2004 and 2005. It was planned for HOS court, but it was changed to rental housing before it was occupied.

Houses

Demographics
According to the 2016 by-census, Hoi Lai Estate had a population of 16,901. The median age was 38.8 and the majority of residents (96.9 per cent) were of Chinese ethnicity. The average household size was 3.5 people. The median monthly household income of all households (i.e. including both economically active and inactive households) was HK$27,640.

Politics
Hoi Lai Estate is located in Lai Chi Kok South constituency of the Sham Shui Po District Council. It was formerly represented by Yeung Yuk, who was elected in the 2019 elections until July 2021.

See also

Public housing estates in Cheung Sha Wan

References

Residential buildings completed in 2004
Residential buildings completed in 2005
Public housing estates in Hong Kong
Cheung Sha Wan